Yolanda del Carmen Montalvo López (born 24 July 1960) is a Mexican politician from the National Action Party. From 2009 to 2012 she served as Deputy of the LXI Legislature of the Mexican Congress representing Campeche.  She is one of the Richest Politician who was born in Mexico.

References

1960 births
Living people
Politicians from Campeche City
Women members of the Chamber of Deputies (Mexico)
National Action Party (Mexico) politicians
21st-century Mexican politicians
21st-century Mexican women politicians
Deputies of the LXI Legislature of Mexico
Members of the Chamber of Deputies (Mexico) for Campeche